Pothyne obliquetruncata is a species of beetle in the family Cerambycidae and it belongs to class insecta. It was described by Gressitt in 1939.

References

obliquetruncata
Beetles described in 1939